Krisztián Vadócz (born 30 May 1985) is a Hungarian professional footballer who plays as a central midfielder for Uruguayan club Central Español.

Club career

Early years
Born in Budapest, Vadócz made his professional debut aged 17 with hometown club Budapest Honvéd FC, and caught the eye of AJ Auxerre in summer 2005. However, he managed no Ligue 1 appearances in a two-year spell, finishing his last on loan to Motherwell in Scotland.

In June 2007, Vadócz was finally released by the French, joining NEC Nijmegen. During the season, he was an essential midfield element for a team that finished a comfortable eighth in the Eredivisie.

Osasuna
On 11 August 2008, Vadócz agreed to a four-year contract with CA Osasuna for a €950,000 transfer fee. Never an undisputed starter in his first season in La Liga, he did score important goals against UD Almería (3–1, after only playing one minute) and at Atlético Madrid (4–2).

In the 2009–10 campaign, Vadócz appeared in exactly the same number of matches for the Navarrese, again mainly from the bench. On 11 April 2010, he netted from 35 yards to help his team to a 2–0 home win over Real Zaragoza.

Late career
Vadócz was released by Osasuna in the last day of the 2011 summer transfer window, immediately signing with former side NEC. On 6 September 2012 he changed clubs and countries again, joining Odense Boldklub of the Danish Superliga.

On 14 November 2014, Vadócz moved to the Indian Super League with FC Pune City, as an injury replacement for John Goossens. On 16 February of the following year, he was signed by Grasshopper Club Zürich from the Swiss Super League.

On 3 April 2015, Vadócz scored twice against FC Sion to help to a 5–0 victory at the Stade Tourbillon. On 19 September he moved back to Spain, after agreeing to a one-year deal with Deportivo Alavés.

On 28 January 2016, after appearing rarely for the Basques, Vadócz terminated his contract and joined Perth Glory FC on an injury-replacement contract. At the end of the season, he was not offered a new deal and was released.

Vadócz signed for Mumbai City FC on 28 June 2016, thus returning to the Indian top division. Hong Kong Premier League's Kitchee SC announced his signing for six months the following 11 January, and on 8 June the 32-year-old renewed his contract with the latter until the end of the 2017–18 campaign, where he won the Hong Kong Footballer of the Year, Players' Player of the Year, Most Favourite Player and Top Midfielder awards.

Vadócz returned to his native Hungary on 5 July 2018, agreeing to a one-year deal with Honvéd. On 28 August, however, he terminated his contract by mutual consent because he opted to continue to play abroad.

Vadócz returned to Kitchee on 17 October 2018, with head coach Chu Chi Kwong confirming that the player had signed a multi-year contract. The following 27 August, he left.

After six months at Honvéd, Vadócz joined Peñarol of the Uruguayan Primera División on 4 January 2020, where he was reunited with former Mumbai City and Kitchee teammate Diego Forlán who acted as manager of the club. One year later, he signed for Montevideo Wanderers F.C. of the same country and league.

International career
Vadócz made his debut for both Hungary's under-21 and the full side in 2004. He scored his first goal for the latter a year later, in a 3–0 friendly win over Antigua and Barbuda in Miami.

International goals
(Hungary score listed first, score column indicates score after each Vadócz goal)

Honours
Honvéd
Hungarian Cup runner-up: 2003–04

Kitchee
Hong Kong Premier League: 2016–17, 2017–18
Hong Kong Senior Challenge Shield: 2016–17, 2018–19
Hong Kong FA Cup: 2016–17, 2017–18, 2018–19
Sapling Cup: 2017–18
Hong Kong Community Shield: 2017

Individual
Hong Kong Footballer of the Year: 2018

References

External links

1985 births
Living people
Hungarian footballers
Footballers from Budapest
Association football midfielders
Nemzeti Bajnokság I players
Budapest Honvéd FC players
Championnat National 2 players
AJ Auxerre players
Scottish Premier League players
Motherwell F.C. players
Eredivisie players
NEC Nijmegen players
La Liga players
Segunda División players
CA Osasuna players
Deportivo Alavés players
Danish Superliga players
Odense Boldklub players
Indian Super League players
FC Pune City players
Mumbai City FC players
Swiss Super League players
Grasshopper Club Zürich players
A-League Men players
Perth Glory FC players
Hong Kong Premier League players
Kitchee SC players
Uruguayan Primera División players
Uruguayan Segunda División players
Peñarol players
Montevideo Wanderers F.C. players
Central Español players
Hungary under-21 international footballers
Hungary international footballers
Hungarian expatriate footballers
Expatriate footballers in France
Expatriate footballers in Scotland
Expatriate footballers in the Netherlands
Expatriate footballers in Spain
Expatriate men's footballers in Denmark
Expatriate footballers in India
Expatriate footballers in Switzerland
Expatriate soccer players in Australia
Expatriate footballers in Hong Kong
Expatriate footballers in Uruguay
Hungarian expatriate sportspeople in France
Hungarian expatriate sportspeople in Scotland
Hungarian expatriate sportspeople in the Netherlands
Hungarian expatriate sportspeople in Spain
Hungarian expatriate sportspeople in Denmark
Hungarian expatriate sportspeople in India
Hungarian expatriate sportspeople in Switzerland
Hungarian expatriate sportspeople in Australia
Hungarian expatriate sportspeople in Hong Kong
Hungarian expatriate sportspeople in Uruguay